Revanche (In English: Revenge) is the sixth album from the Brazilian rock band, Fresno, released in 2010, through Universal Music. The album is heavier, musically and lyrically, than their previous album "Redenção".

The album has 13 tracks, ranging from heavy rock to romantic ballads. The album had two singles: "Deixa o tempo" and "Eu Sei". 
The lyrics are mostly about love and obstacles in life. The musics and the lyrics has much in common with the album's title, it's like a revenge of Fresno, as an answer to all those who criticize the band.

Cover 
The album cover is a sky with many shining stars, like the space.

Track listing

Tour 
A tour promoting the album will start in Porto Alegre on September 26, 2010.

Sales 
In the fourth week Top 30 CDs Sales of Hot 100 Brasil, the album reached the top position.

References 

2010 albums
Fresno (band) albums